{{safesubst:#invoke:RfD||From Saigon to Dienbien Fu|month = March
|day =  4
|year = 2023
|time = 04:56
|timestamp = 20230304045641

|content=
REDIRECT From Saigon to Dien Bien Phu

}}